Omar Bliadze (born 31 March 1942 in Tbilisi) (Georgian: ბლიაძე ომარ), is a Georgian  Greco-Roman wrestler. He won gold medal at the 1968 European Championship.

World championships

Omar Bliadze won a silver medal at the 1969 World Championship in Argentina.

References 
Department of Sport and Youth Affairs of Georgia *

Male sport wrestlers from Georgia (country)
Soviet male sport wrestlers
1942 births
Living people
Sportspeople from Tbilisi
20th-century people from Georgia (country)